Dansyl chloride or 5-(DimethylAmino)Naphthalene-1-SulfonYL chloride is a reagent that reacts with primary amino groups in both aliphatic and aromatic amines to produce stable blue- or blue-green–fluorescent sulfonamide adducts. It can also be made to react with secondary amines. Dansyl chloride is widely used to modify amino acids; specifically, protein sequencing and amino acid analysis.
Dansyl chloride may also be denoted DNSC.  Likewise, a similar derivative, dansyl amide is known as DNSA.

In addition, these protein-DNSC conjugates are sensitive to their immediate environment.  This, in combination with their ability to accept energy (as in fluorescence resonance energy transfer) from the amino acid tryptophan, allows this labeling technique to be used in investigating protein folding and dynamics.

The fluorescence of these sulfonamide adducts can be enhanced by adding alpha-cyclodextrin. Dansyl chloride is unstable in dimethyl sulfoxide, which should never be used to prepare solutions of the reagent.

The extinction coefficient of dansyl derivatives are important for measuring their concentration in solution.  Dansyl chloride is one of the simplest sulfonamide derivatives, so it commonly serves as a starting reagent for the production of other derivatives.  Exotic derivatives may have very different extinction coefficients, but others, such as dansyl amide, are similar to dansyl chloride in absorption and fluorescence characteristics.  But even for dansyl chloride, there are a variety of extinction coefficient values that have been reported.  Some of the values are used to estimate the extent of success in attempts to conjugate the dye to a protein.  Other values may be used to determine a precise concentration of a stock solution.  See the table below for specific values and their uses.

For all of the studies below, the absorption value is always taken at the maximum that appears between 310 nm and 350 nm.  The peak is broad, so the measurement is not very sensitive to wavelength miscalibration of the spectrophotometer, and error due to miscalibration can be avoided by taking the value at the maximum instead of strictly using 330 nm.

Preparation
This compound may be prepared by reacting the corresponding  sulfonic acid with excess phosphorus oxychloride (POCl3) at room temperature.

References

Chemical tests
Reagents for organic chemistry
Sulfonyl halides
Naphthalenes
Dimethylamino compounds